František Majdloch (14 October 1929 – 30 November 2001) was a Czechoslovak boxer. He competed at the 1948, 1952 and the 1956 Summer Olympics. He died on 30 November 2001, at the age of 72.

References

External links
 

1929 births
2001 deaths
Czech male boxers
Czechoslovak male boxers
Olympic boxers of Czechoslovakia
Boxers at the 1948 Summer Olympics
Boxers at the 1952 Summer Olympics
Boxers at the 1956 Summer Olympics
People from Hranice (Přerov District)
Bantamweight boxers
Sportspeople from the Olomouc Region